Omphalophana serrata is a moth of the family Noctuidae. It is found in Morocco, Portugal, Spain, Sardinia, Italy and Sicily.

Adults are on wing in March, May and August.

The larvae feed on Scabiosa species.

External links
Species info

Cuculliinae
Moths of Europe
Moths described in 1835